Tunadal is a locality situated in Sundsvall Municipality, Västernorrland County, Sweden with 360 inhabitants in 2010.

History
Steam powered saw mills were introduced in Sweden in 1849 at Tunadal. Twenty  more steam powered saw mills were started in the decade. These sawmills were usually placed near ports and the former water powered saw mills were closed.

References 

Populated places in Sundsvall Municipality
Medelpad